Weilen unter den Rinnen (Weilen) is a municipality in the Zollernalbkreis district, in Baden-Württemberg, Germany.

History
Weilen unter den Rinnen was ruled by Austria from 1381 to 1805, when it was ceded in the process of German mediatization to the Kingdom of Württemberg. After World War II, Weilen developed into a commuter town, beginning in the 1950s with new residential space at the town's northern and southwestern extremities. Weilen continued to grow through the 1980s and 1990s.

Geography
The municipality (Gemeinde) of Weilen unter den Rinnen is part of the Zollernalb district of Baden-Württemberg, a state of the Federal Republic of Germany. It lies on the southwest edge of the district, along the border with Tuttlingen district. Weilen is physically located in the foothills of the Swabian Jura, on the albtrauf near the Ortenberg above the Schlichem.

Coat of arms
Weilen's coat of arms shows a field of red crossed by a white bar containing, in red, the letters "V" and "R", separated by a six-pointed star. The pattern is taken from the seal of the local Schultheiß, itself drawn from the Austrian blazon. The tincture is also a reference to Austria, and the letters "V" and "R" to the name, rendered in an old spelling as "W" and "R". A municipal flag was issued on 4 July 1983.

Transportation

References

External links
  (in German)